Saurita fusca is a moth in the subfamily Arctiinae. It was described by Paul Dognin in 1923. It is found in the Amazon region.

References

Natural History Museum Lepidoptera generic names catalog

Moths described in 1923
Saurita